A person from Los Angeles is called an Angeleno. 

The demographics of Los Angeles are determined by population surveys such as the American Community Survey and the United States Census.  According to U.S. Census Bureau estimates, Los Angeles' population was 3,979,576 in 2019.

Race, ethnicity, and national origin

The 1990 United States Census and 2000 United States Census found that non-Hispanic whites were becoming a minority in Los Angeles. Estimates for the 2010 United States Census results find Latinos to be approximately half (47–49%) of the city's population, growing from 40% in 2000 and 30–35% in 1990 census.

The racial/ethnic/cultural composition of Los Angeles as of the 2005–2009 American Community Survey was as follows:
 Hispanic or Latino (of any race): 47.5%
 Non-Hispanic Whites: 29.4%
Other: 25.2%
 Asian: 10.7%
 Black or African American: 9.8%
 Two or more races: 2.8%
 Native American: 0.5%
 Native Hawaiian and Other Pacific Islander: 0.2%

Approximately 59.4% of Los Angeles' residents were born in the United States, and 0.9% were born in Puerto Rico, US territories, or abroad to American parents. 39.7% of the population were foreign-born.  The majority of those born overseas (64.5%) came from Latin America. A large minority (26.3%) were born in Asia. Smaller numbers were born in Europe (6.5%), Africa (1.5%), Northern America (0.9%), and Oceania (0.3%).

Languages
According to the 2021 American Community Survey, the most commonly spoken languages in Los Angeles by people aged 5 years and over (3,650,704 people):
 Language other than English: 56.8% (2,073,581)
 Speak only English: 43.2% (1,577,123)
 Spanish: 40.1% (1,462,335)
 Asian languages and Pacific Islander languages: 7.9% (287,739)
 Other Indo-European languages: 7.4% (271,484)
 Other languages: 1.4% (52,023)

Households and educational attainment
According to the 2006-2008 American Community Survey, the types of households were as follows out of 1,275,534 total:
 Family households: 61.1% (778,991)
 With own children under 18 years: 30.9% (394,253)
 Married-couple family: 39.1% (498,998)
 With own children under 18 years: 19.6% (250,054)
 Male householder, no wife present, family: 6.9% (88,600)
 With own children under 18 years: 3.0% (38,239)
 Female householder, no husband present, family: 15.0% (191,393)
 With own children under 18 years: 8.3% (105,960)
 Non-family households: 38.9% (496,543)
 Householder living alone: 30.2% (385,843)
 65 years and over: 8.0% (102,016)
Households with one or more people under 18 years: 34.6% (441,723)
Households with one or more people 65 years and over: 21.1% (268,624)
 Average household size: 2.87
 Average family size: 3.67

According to the same survey, the educational status of residents over 25 years (2,407,775 total) was as follows:
 Less than 9th grade: 15.9% (383,385)
 9th to 12th grade, no diploma: 11.1% (267,833)
 High school graduate: 21.1% (509,021)
 Some college, no degree: 16.7% (402,973)
 Associate degree: 5.9% (141,764)
 Bachelor's degree: 19.2% (462,701)
 Graduate or professional degree: 10.0% (240,098)
 Percent high school graduate or higher: 72.9%
 Percent bachelor's degree or higher: 29.2%

Income and poverty
According to the 2006-2008 American Community Survey, the income status of residents was as follows:
 Median household income: $48,610
 Mean household income: $76,557
 Median family income: $53,008
 Mean family income: $83,965
 Median non-family income: $38,227
 Mean non-family income: $61,155

According to the same survey, the poverty status of residents was as follows:
 All families: 15.6%
 Married-couple families: 10.2%
 Families with female householder, no husband present: 30.1%
 All people: 18.9%
 Under 18 years: 27.8%
 18 years and over: 16.0%
 18 to 64 years: 16.5%
 65 years and over: 12.9%

Employment
According to the 2006-2008 American Community Survey, the employment status of residents was as follows
 Population 16 years and over: 2,923,315
 In labor force: 65.8% (1,924,833)
 Civilian labor force: 65.8% (1,923,236)
 Employed: 61.3% (1,792,596)
 Unemployed: 4.5% (130,640)
 Armed Forces: 0.1% (1,597)
 Not in labor force: 34.2% (998,482)

Additional information

According to a 2014 study by the Pew Research Center, Christianity is the most prevalently practiced religion in Los Angeles (65%). 32% of these 65% belonged to the Roman Catholic Church, 30% to various Protestant denominations and the last 3% to other Christian persuasions (including Orthodox Christians, Jehovah's Witnesses and Mormons). 25% of the population was not affiliated with any religion (with 4% self-identifying as atheists and another 4% self-identifying as agnostics), 9% of the inhabitants adhered to non-Christian religions (primarily Judaism, Islam, Buddhism and Hinduism) and a remaining 1% answered 'don't know'.

The city has the most Druze living anywhere in the world outside Lebanon or Syria.

The world's largest population of Saudi Arabian expatriates (est. 20,000) according to the Saudi Embassy of the USA.

About 15,000 Louisiana Creole persons of Acadian and Cajun background from Louisiana and the U.S. Gulf coast, many live in south-central L.A. alone.

In the 1980 and 1990 Census, Bosnians established themselves in fairly large numbers in L.A. before the breakup of the former Yugoslavia and Bosnian War of the 1990s. However, Yugoslav immigration was present in Los Angeles and Southern California (i.e. San Pedro, Los Angeles) since the turn of the 20th century.

Salvadoran Americans are the second largest Hispanic population in Los Angeles, a city which holds the largest Salvadoran population outside of El Salvador and the Salvadoran diaspora living abroad and overseas. These were refugees that arrived in the 1980s and 1990s during the Salvadoran Civil War which was part of the Central American Crisis.

Armenians made an ethnic presence in Silver Lake/Elysian Park and Los Feliz/Hollywood.

The city has a sizable Puerto Rican community (50,000 out of 145,000 in California), with just as many in San Diego, the largest west of the Mississippi River and also Puerto Rico.

Once a tradition the descendants of original Anglo-American settlers who represented civic leaders and economic influence in the city of L.A. held Iowa picnics in MacArthur Park, but that's no longer held since the early 1970s.

Many neighborhoods in West Hollywood and parts of Long Beach are known for having majority LGBT communities.

Persons of the Baháʼí Faith, Mormons in the Latter-Day Saints churches, Seventh-day Adventists with their church-operated Loma Linda University, and the Church of Scientology headquarters are large theological/religious influences in Los Angeles and throughout Southern California. Los Angeles has the largest Roman Catholic Archdiocese (Archdiocese of Los Angeles) in the US.

Cherokee Indians, among other Native American tribes such as the Apache, Choctaw, Comanche, Hopi, Muscogee (Creek), Navajo, Nez Perce, Paiute, Shawnee and Zuni made Los Angeles probably have the largest Urban Indian population.

L.A. along with Pasadena in the turn of the 20th century were one of two earliest world-known retirement communities to attracted a large number of senior citizens looked for a warmer climate to better fight health ailments.

L.A. hosts the fourth largest number of Muslims in the United States. When the estimated 500,000 Muslims living in the greater Los Angeles area are included, Los Angeles hosts the second largest number of Muslims among U.S. cities.

There are around 50,000 Romani people living in the Los Angeles area, making it one of the cities with the highest Roma concentration in the U.S.

More than 1.2 million Los Angeles residents are of Mexican ancestry. Mexican influences can be seen in the city’s culture. Mexican Americans are the largest ethnic group in Los Angeles.

Greeks began immigrating to Los Angeles in the 1890s. There was a small population of Greeks living in the Boyle Heights area, along with other immigrant groups including Russians, Syrians, Armenians, and East European Jews by the late 1890s.

See also
 List of notable people from Los Angeles
 Greater Los Angeles
 History of Mexican Americans in Los Angeles
 History of Armenian Americans in Los Angeles
 History of Chinese Americans in Los Angeles
 History of Iranian Americans in Los Angeles

References

 
Culture of Los Angeles
Geography of Los Angeles
Economy of Los Angeles
Los Angeles